The Union of Humanist Democrats-Yuki (French: Union des démocrates et humanistes-Yuki) is a political party in the Republic of the Congo.

History 
The party was founded on 19 March 2017. It was founded by Guy Brice Parfait Kolélas, the runner up in the 2016 presidential election.

Their annual conference was held in Brazzaville in March 2022.

Electoral results

References 
Political parties in the Republic of the Congo
2017 establishments in Africa
Political parties established in 2017